Frank Smith Pittman, III, M.D. (1935 – November 24, 2012) was an American psychiatrist and author.  He wrote a regular column, "Ask Dr. Frank", which used to appear in Psychology Today.

During his lifetime, he was a "widely quoted author" of Man Enough: Fathers, Sons and the Search for Masculinity and Private Lies: Infidelity and Betrayal of Intimacy.  He was also author of books Grow Up!: How Taking Responsibility Can Make You a Happy Adult, and Turning Points: Treating Families in Transition and Crisis.

Dr. Pittman practiced out of Atlanta, Georgia, where he was active as a psychiatrist and family therapist from 1962 until his death in 2012.  Both of Dr. Pittman's daughters are psychologists.

Infidelity was a central focus of Dr. Pittman's work. In a 1993 article for Psychology Today.

In 2003, Dr. Pittman was recognized with the Smart Marriages Impact Award at the annual conference of the Coalition for Marriage, Family and Couples Education.

Dr. Pittman died at his Atlanta home on November 24, 2012 of cancer. He is survived by his wife of 52 years, Betsy Pittman, two daughters, Dr. Tina Wagers of Boulder, CO., and Dr. Virginia Pistilli of Portola, CA.; a son, Frank S. Pittman IV of Atlanta, GA; a sister, Joanna Fox of Cashiers, NC, and seven grandchildren.

Education
Research, Community Mental Health, Family Therapy, Denver, Colorado, from a grant from the National Institute of Mental Health
Medical Residency, psychiatry, Emory University

Publications

Books
Turning Points: Treating Families in Transition and Crisis, Frank Pittman, M.D., A Norton Professional Book, (Hardcover), W. W. Norton & Company; 1st ed edition, May 1987, W W Norton page
Private Lies: Infidelity and Betrayal of Intimacy, Frank Pittman, M.D., W. W. Norton & Company; Reprint edition November 1990, W W Norton page
Mentiras Privadas (Spanish edition), Amorrortu Editores, September 1994, 
Man enough: fathers, sons and the search for masculinity, Frank Pittman, M.D., Perigee Trade; Reprint edition October 1, 1994, 
Grow Up!: How Taking Responsibility Can Make You a Happy Adult, Golden Guides from St. Martin's Press, July 30, 1999

Articles
"How to be a Grownup Even Around Your Own Parents", Psychotherapy.net, October 2002.
"Beware Older Women Ahead," Psychology Today, January 1, 1999.
"How to Manage Your Kids," Psychology Today, May 1, 1995.
"How to Manage Mom and Dad," Psychology Today, November 1, 1994.
"Ask Dr. Frank", Psychology Today, May/June 1994 issue.
"Ask Dr. Frank", Psychology Today, March/April 1994 issue.
"A Buyer's Guide to Psychotherapy," Psychology Today, January 1, 1994.
"Fathers and Sons," Psychology Today, September 1, 1993.
"Beyond Betrayal: Life After Infidelity," Psychology Today, May 1, 1993.
Google Scholar articlesGoogle Scholar

Presentations
"What are Men for, Anyway?", Reno, Nevada, June 28, 2003, Keynote Address, Smart Marriages Conference
Response to "The Death of 'Till Death Us Do Part': "Marriage in the 20th Century", July 2002, Keynote Address, Smart Marriages Conference
Myth and Ritual in American Life, A Sloan Center for Working Families, "Ritual Function and Family Dysfunction: The Therapist's View", Emory University

See also
Psychotherapy
Family therapy
Mental health
Relationship education

References

External links

More news articles, Google News
An Interview with Frank Pittman, MD, by Victor Yalom, PhD, Evolution of Psychotherapy Conference, 2000 (www.psychotherapy.net)
Infidelity Comes Out of the Closet, The New York Times, April 29, 1999
Infidelity reaches beyond having sex, By Karen S. Peterson, USA Today, 1/8/2003
Dear Ann: Thanks for 47 years of advice, USA Today, 06/23/2002
Marriage experts converge here; top tip is don't split, The Atlanta Journal-Constitution, 06/21/06
Search for a soul mate, or love the one you're with?, 5/28/2003, USA Today
Study: Divorce, living together new norms, USA Today
Why men drag their feet down the aisle, 06/26/2002, USA Today
Cohabiting can make marriage an iffy proposition, Even married, men may still feel less committed, July 8, 2002, USA Today
Work & Family: Couples separate checking accounts, The Wall Street Journal, February 24, 2005

American psychiatrists
American psychotherapists
1935 births
Relationship education
2012 deaths